Mount Wallace is a summit in the Diablo Range, in Alameda County, California.

References

Mountains of Alameda County, California